Talkhab-e Sofla (also Romanized as Talkhāb-e Soflá; also known as Talkhāb-e Pā’īn) is a village in Poshtkuh-e Rostam Rural District, Sorna District, Rostam County, Fars Province, Iran. At the 2006 census, its population was 102, in 21 families.

References 

Populated places in Rostam County